Gene Slagle (November 20, 1914 – December 16, 2006) was a member of the Ohio Senate. He served from 1973 to 1976, representing the 26th District, which encompasses much of North-Central Ohio.

References

1914 births
Democratic Party Ohio state senators
2006 deaths
20th-century American politicians